Juan Manuel Parás González (born 11 April 1956) is a Mexican politician affiliated with the Institutional Revolutionary Party. As of 2014 he served as Deputy of the LX Legislature of the Mexican Congress representing Nuevo León.

References

1956 births
Living people
Politicians from Nuevo León
Members of the Chamber of Deputies (Mexico)
Institutional Revolutionary Party politicians
21st-century Mexican politicians